The Benajah Gray Log House is a historic loghouse in Antioch, Tennessee, U.S..

History
The land was granted to Lardner Clark in 1784.  In the early 1800s, Benajay Gray, the son of American Revolutionary War veteran James Gray, purchased some acres of land. He proceeded to build the log house by 1805. By the 1870s, it became a horsebreeding farm. It was subsequently inherited by his descendants. By the 1980s, it belonged to Gray's great-great-granddaughter, Ernestine Huffman.

The house has been listed on the National Register of Historic Places since July 11, 1985.

References

Houses on the National Register of Historic Places in Tennessee
Houses completed in 1805
Buildings and structures in Davidson County, Tennessee
Horse farms in Tennessee